Ma'ale Levona (lit. Ascent of Frankincense) is an Israeli settlement organized as a community settlement in the West Bank. Located to the south-east of Ariel, it falls under the jurisdiction of Mateh Binyamin Regional Council.

The international community considers Israeli settlements in the West Bank illegal under international law, but the Israeli government disputes this.

Etymology
The valley may be named for the frankincense grown there in Biblical days for the incense used in the Tabernacle of near-by Shiloh. There was an Israelite village on the edge of the valley that also bore the name "Levonah" (Judges 21:19). The name of that ancient site is preserved in the name of the Palestinian village Al-Lubban ash-Sharqiya (Eastern Lubban), on part of whose land Ma'ale Levona is constructed.

History

Antiquity
Ma'ale Levona overlooks the ancient mountain pass noteworthy as the site of the Battle of Ascent of Lebonah, the first battle of the Maccabees against the Selucids. The mountain pass, the "Ascent of Levonah" is to the east of the village, and links the Levonah valley to its north with the Shiloh valley to its south. Judah Maccabee killed the Samarian mysarch Apollonius in this battle, taking his sword for himself.

Khirbet el-Qutt, an archeological site, is situated directly north of Ma'ale Levona. Archaeologists suggest that it was a fortified Jewish village in the late Second Temple period. Three mikvehs, a hiding complex and a necropolis were found at the site. A fort or monastery was constructed on the site's eastern slopes during the Late Roman or Byzantine period. The archeologists suggested identifying the site with Lakitia, mentioned in Lamentations Rabbah as one of the three stations set up by Hadrian to catch fugitives after the Bar Kokhba revolt.

Modern era
According to ARIJ, Israel confiscated land from 3 neighbouring Palestinian villages in order to construct Ma'ale Levona:

447 dunams from Sinjil,
229 dunams from Al-Lubban ash-Sharqiya,
72 dunams from Abwein.

Ma'ale Levona was initially established as a Nahal outpost. It later became a civilian settlement under the municipal jurisdiction of the Matte Binyamin Regional Council. It is located in the northern West Bank, in the Shilo-Eli bloc near Ariel. Ma'ale Levona is home to around 120 families.

References

Religious Israeli settlements
Nahal settlements
Mateh Binyamin Regional Council
Populated places established in 1983
1983 establishments in the Palestinian territories
Community settlements
Israeli settlements in the West Bank